Laurel Johnson (born 7 August 1967) is a Jamaican sprinter. She competed in the women's 4 × 100 metres relay at the 1988 Summer Olympics.

References

External links
 

1967 births
Living people
Athletes (track and field) at the 1988 Summer Olympics
Jamaican female sprinters
Olympic athletes of Jamaica
Place of birth missing (living people)
Olympic female sprinters